Andrew Evans Ikefe (born 10 October 1998) is a Nigerian footballer who plays as a centre-back for  club Shabab Sahel.

Career 
Ikefe joined Niger Tornadoes in the 2016–17 Nigeria Professional Football League (NPFL). Playing as a centre-back, he scored a goal in a NPFL match against Wikki Tourists which earned him a goal of the week nomination.

After two seasons, he moved on to spend the 2018–19 season with Kwara United. On 22 August 2019, Ikefe joined Plateau United ahead of the 2019–20 campaign, and he has since grown to become the club's vice captain.

Ikefe moved to Shabab Sahel in the Lebanese Premier League in August 2022.

References

External links 
 
 

1998 births
Living people
People from Kaduna
Nigerian footballers
Association football central defenders
Katsina United F.C. players
Niger Tornadoes F.C. players
Kwara United F.C. players
Plateau United F.C. players
Shabab Al Sahel FC players
Nigeria Professional Football League players
Lebanese Premier League players
Nigerian expatriate footballers
Nigerian expatriate sportspeople in Lebanon
Expatriate footballers in Lebanon